Fawlty Towers is a British television sitcom written by John Cleese and Connie Booth, originally broadcast on BBC Two in 1975 and 1979. Two series of six episodes each were made. The show was ranked first on a list of the 100 Greatest British Television Programmes drawn up by the British Film Institute in 2000 and, in 2019, it was named the greatest ever British TV sitcom by a panel of comedy experts compiled by the Radio Times.

The series is set in Fawlty Towers, a fictional hotel in the seaside town of Torquay on the English Riviera. The plots centre on the tense, rude and put-upon owner Basil Fawlty (Cleese), his bossy wife Sybil (Prunella Scales), the sensible chambermaid Polly (Booth) who often is the peacemaker and voice of reason, and the hapless and English-challenged Spanish waiter Manuel (Andrew Sachs). They show their attempts to run the hotel amidst farcical situations and an array of demanding and eccentric guests and tradespeople.

The idea of the show came from Cleese after he stayed at the Gleneagles Hotel in Torquay, Devon, in 1970 (along with the rest of the Monty Python troupe), where he encountered the eccentric hotel owner Donald Sinclair. Stuffy and snobbish, Sinclair treated guests as though they were a hindrance to his running of the hotel (a waitress who worked for him stated "it was as if he didn't want the guests to be there"). Sinclair was the inspiration for Cleese's character Basil Fawlty.

In 1976 and 1980, Fawlty Towers won the British Academy Television Award for Best Scripted Comedy. In 1980, Cleese received the British Academy Television Award for Best Entertainment Performance, and, in a 2001 poll conducted by Channel 4, Basil Fawlty was ranked second on their list of the 100 Greatest TV Characters. The popularity of Fawlty Towers has endured, and it is often re-broadcast. The BBC profile for the series states that "the British sitcom by which all other British sitcoms must be judged, Fawlty Towers withstands multiple viewings, is eminently quotable ('don't mention the war') and stands up to this day as a jewel in the BBC's comedy crown."

A sequel series starring Cleese and his daughter Camilla is in development as of February 2023. Cleese subsequently confirmed to GB News that the sequel series, unlike the original series, would not be broadcast on the BBC.

Origins

In May 1970, the Monty Python comedy group stayed at the now demolished Gleneagles Hotel in Torquay, Devon while filming on location in Paignton. John Cleese was fascinated with the behaviour of the owner, Donald Sinclair, later describing him as "the rudest man I've ever come across in my life". Among such behaviour by Sinclair was his criticism of Terry Gilliam's "too American" table etiquette and tossing Eric Idle's briefcase out of a window "in case it contained a bomb". Asked why anyone would want to bomb the hotel, Sinclair replied, "We've had a lot of staff problems". Michael Palin states Sinclair "seemed to view us as a colossal inconvenience". Rosemary Harrison, a waitress at the Gleneagles under Sinclair, described him as "bonkers" and lacking in hospitality, deeming him wholly unsuitable for a hotel proprietor. "It was as if he didn't want the guests to be there." Cleese and his then wife Connie Booth stayed on at the hotel after filming, furthering their research of its owner. Demolished in 2015, the building was replaced by a new retirement home named Sachs Lodge in memory of Andrew Sachs who played Manuel in the sitcom and who died in 2016.

Cleese was a writer on the 1970s British TV sitcom Doctor in the House for London Weekend Television. An early prototype of the character that became known as Basil Fawlty was developed in an episode ("No Ill Feeling") of the third Doctor series (titled Doctor at Large). In this edition, the main character checks into a small-town hotel, his very presence seemingly winding up the aggressive and incompetent manager (played by Timothy Bateson) with a domineering wife. The show was broadcast on 30 May 1971.

Cleese said in 2008 that the first Fawlty Towers script he and Booth wrote was rejected by the BBC. At a 30th anniversary event honouring the show, Cleese said,

Cleese was paid £6,000 for 43 weeks' work and supplemented his income by appearing in television advertisements. He states, "I have to thank the advertising industry for making this possible. Connie and I used to spend six weeks writing each episode and we didn't make a lot of money out of it. If it hadn't been for the commercials I wouldn't have been able to afford to spend so much time on the script."

Production
Although the series is set in Torquay, no part of it was shot in South West England. For the exterior filming, the Wooburn Grange Country Club in Bourne End, Buckinghamshire was used instead of a hotel. In several episodes of the series (notably "The Kipper and the Corpse", "The Anniversary", and "Basil the Rat"), the entrance gate at the bottom of the drive states the real name of the location. This listed building later served for a short time as a nightclub named "Basil's" after the series ended, before being destroyed by a fire in March 1991. The remnants of the building were demolished and a housing estate was built on the site. Few traces of the original site exist today.

Other location filming was done mostly around Harrow: firstly the 'damn good thrashing' scene in "Gourmet Night" in which Basil loses his temper and attacks his broken-down car with a tree branch. It was filmed at the T-junction of Lapstone Gardens and Mentmore Close. Secondly the episode "The Germans", the opening shot is of Northwick Park Hospital. Thirdly "Gourmet Night"'s exterior of André's restaurant was at Preston Road. It is now a Chinese and Indian restaurant Wings next to a launderette.
Both Cleese and Booth were keen on every script being perfect, and some episodes took four months and required as many as ten drafts until they were satisfied.

Cleese said one of the reasons the series worked so well was the quality of the scripts and the care taken over the editing. He told a TV interviewer that while the average BBC half hour comedy script had 65 pages, the ones for Fawlty Towers had between 135 and 140 pages. "We literally did twice as many camera cuts - average shows got 200, we used to have 400. So there was an enormous amount in there. The other thing is that they were very well constructed,:" he said. Once an episode was in the can, the editing process started. "We did anything between 20 and 25 hours editing each show. Almost every minute you see up on the screen, we spent one hour editing and it was only by doing that you could just tighten it up, just tighten it there and take out a line of dialogue, sometimes take out a repetition, they'll then lose two lines of dialogue there. That's what really got the pace on it."

The theme music was composed by Dennis Wilson. It was recorded by the highly respected Aeolian Quartet, who were asked by director John Davis to perform the piece badly, although in the end they did not.

Plot directions and examples
The series focuses on the exploits and misadventures of short-fused hotelier Basil Fawlty and his acerbic wife Sybil, as well as their employees: waiter Manuel, Polly Sherman, and, in the second series, chef Terry. The episodes typically revolve around Basil's efforts to "raise the tone" of his hotel and his increasing frustration at numerous complications and mistakes, both his own and those of others, which prevent him from doing so.

Much of the humour comes from Basil's overly aggressive manner, engaging in angry but witty arguments with guests, staff and, in particular, Sybil, whom he addresses (in a faux-romantic way) with insults such as "that golfing puff adder", "my little piranha fish" and "my little nest of vipers". Despite this, Basil frequently feels intimidated, Sybil being able to cow him at any time, usually with a short, sharp cry of "Basil!" At the end of some episodes, Basil succeeds in annoying (or at least bemusing) the guests and frequently gets his comeuppance.

The plots occasionally are intricate and always farcical, involving coincidences, misunderstandings, cross-purposes and meetings both missed and accidental. The innuendo of the bedroom farce is sometimes present (often to the disgust of the socially conservative Basil) but it is his eccentricity, not his lust, that drives the plots. The events test to the breaking point what little patience Basil has, sometimes causing him to have a near breakdown by the end of the episode.

The guests at the hotel typically are comic foils to Basil's anger and outbursts. Guest characters in each episode provide different characteristics (working class, promiscuous, foreign) that he cannot stand. Requests both reasonable and impossible test his temper. Even the afflicted annoy him, as for example in the episode "Communication Problems", revolving around the havoc caused by the frequent misunderstandings between the staff and the hard-of-hearing Mrs. Richards. Near the end, Basil pretends to faint just at the mention of her name. This episode is typical of the show's careful weaving of humorous situations through comedy cross-talk. The show also uses mild black humour at times, notably when Basil is forced to hide a dead body and in his comments about Sybil ("Did you ever see that film, How to Murder Your Wife? ... Awfully good. I saw it six times.") and to Mrs Richards, ("May I suggest that you consider moving to a hotel closer to the sea? Or preferably in it.").

Basil's physical outbursts are primarily directed at Manuel, an emotional but largely innocent Spaniard whose confused English vocabulary causes him to make elementary mistakes. At times, Basil beats Manuel with a frying pan and smacks his forehead with a spoon. The violence towards Manuel caused rare negative criticism of the show. Sybil and Polly, on the other hand, are more patient and understanding toward Manuel; everyone's usual excuse for his behaviour to guests is, "He's from Barcelona"; Manuel even once used the excuse for himself.

Basil longs for a touch of class, sometimes playing recordings of classical music. In the first episode he is playing music by Brahms when Sybil remarks, after pestering him asking to do different tasks: "You could have them both done by now if you hadn't spent the whole morning skulking in there listening to that racket." Basil replies, with exasperation, "Racket?? That's Brahms! Brahms' Third Racket!" Basil often displays blatant snobbishness as he attempts to climb the social ladder, frequently expressing disdain for the "riff-raff", "cretins" and "yobbos" that he believes regularly populate his hotel. His desperation is readily apparent as he makes increasingly hopeless manoeuvres and painful faux pas in trying to curry favour with those he perceives as having superior social status. Yet he finds himself forced to serve those individuals that are "beneath" him. As such, Basil's efforts tend to be counter-productive, with guests leaving the hotel in disgust and his marriage (and sanity) stretching to breaking point.

Characters

Basil Fawlty

Basil Fawlty, played by John Cleese, is a cynical and snobbish misanthrope who is desperate to belong to a higher social class. He sees a successful hotel as a means of achieving this, yet his job forces him to be polite to people he despises.

He is intimidated by his wife Sybil Fawlty. He yearns to stand up to her, but his plans frequently conflict with her demands. She is often verbally abusive (describing him as "an ageing, brilliantined stick insect") but although he towers over her, he often finds himself on the receiving end of her temper, verbally and physically (as in "The Builders").

Basil usually turns to Manuel or Polly to help him with his schemes, while trying his best to keep Sybil from discovering them. However, Basil occasionally laments the time when there was passion in their relationship, now seemingly lost. Also, it appears he still does care for her and he remains loyal to her, and actively resists the flirtations of a French guest in one episode. The penultimate episode, "The Anniversary", is about his efforts to put together a surprise anniversary party involving their closest friends. Things go wrong as Basil pretends the anniversary date does not remind him of anything though he pretends to have a stab at it by reeling off a list of random anniversaries, starting with the Battle of Agincourt, for which he receives a slap from Sybil, who becomes increasingly frustrated and angry. He continues guessing even after Sybil is out of earshot, and mentions other anniversaries (none of which happened on 17 April), including the Battle of Trafalgar and Yom Kippur, just to enhance the surprise. Sybil believes he really has forgotten, and leaves in a huff. In an interview in the DVD box set, Cleese claims this episode deliberately takes a slightly different tone from the others, fleshing out their otherwise inexplicable status as a couple.

In keeping with the lack of explanation about the marriage, not much is revealed of the characters' back-stories. It is known that Basil served in the British Army and saw action in the Korean War, possibly as part of his National Service. (John Cleese himself was only 13 when the Korean War ended, making the character of Basil at least five or six years older than he.) Basil exaggerates this period of his life, proclaiming to strangers, "I killed four men." To this Sybil jokes that "He was in the Catering Corps. He used to poison them." Basil often is seen wearing regimental and old boy-style ties, perhaps spuriously, one of which in the colours of the Army Catering Corps. He also claims to have sustained a shrapnel injury to his leg; it tends to flare up at suspiciously convenient times. The only person towards whom Basil consistently exhibits tolerance and good manners is the old and senile Major Gowen, a veteran of one of the world wars (which one is never specified, though he once mentions to Mrs Peignoir that he was in France in 1918) who permanently resides at the hotel. When interacting with Manuel, Basil displays a rudimentary knowledge of Spanish (Basil states that he "learned classical Spanish, not the strange dialect he [Manuel] seems to have picked up"); this knowledge is also ridiculed, as in the first episode in which a guest, whom Basil has immediately dismissed as working-class, communicates fluently with Manuel in Spanish after Basil is unable to do so.

Cleese described Basil as thinking that "he could run a first-rate hotel if he didn't have all the guests getting in the way" and as being "an absolutely awful human being" but says that in comedy if an awful person makes people laugh they unaccountably feel affectionate towards him. Indeed, he is not entirely unsympathetic. The "Hotel Inspectors" and "Gourmet Night" episodes feature guests who are shown to be deeply annoying, with constant and unreasonable demands. In "Gourmet Night" the chef gets drunk and is unable to cook dinner, leaving Basil to scramble in an attempt to salvage the evening. Much of the time, Basil is an unfortunate victim of circumstance.

Sybil Fawlty

Sybil Fawlty, played by Prunella Scales, is Basil's wife. Energetic and petite, she prefers a working wardrobe of tight skirt-suits in shiny fabrics and sports a tower of permed hair augmented with hairpieces and wigs and necessitating the use of overnight curlers. She often is a more effective manager of the hotel, making sure Basil gets certain jobs done or stays out of the way when she is handling difficult guests. Typically when Basil is on the verge of meltdown due to a crisis (usually of his own making), it is Sybil who steps in to clear up the mess and bring some sense to the situation. Despite this, she rarely participates directly in the running of the hotel. During busy check-in sessions or meal times, while everyone else is busy working, Sybil is frequently talking on the phone to one of her friends with her phrase "Oohhh, I knoooooooow" or chatting to customers. She has a distinctive conversational tone and braying laugh, which Basil compares to "someone machine-gunning a seal". Being his wife, she is the only regular character who refers to Basil by his first name. When she barks his name at him, he flinchingly freezes in his tracks.

Basil refers to her by a number of epithets, occasionally to her face, including "that golfing puff-adder", "the dragon", "toxic midget", "the sabre-toothed tart", "my little kommandant", "my little piranha fish", "my little nest of vipers" and "you rancorous, coiffured old sow". Despite these nasty nicknames, Basil is terrified of her. The 1979 episode "The Psychiatrist" contains the only time he loses patience and snaps at her (Basil: "Shut up, I'm fed up." Sybil: "Oh, you've done it now.").

Prunella Scales speculated in an interview for The Complete Fawlty Towers DVD box set that Sybil married Basil because his origins were of a higher social class than hers.

Polly Sherman

Polly Sherman, played by Connie Booth, is a waitress and general assistant at the hotel with artistic aspirations. She is the most competent of the staff and the voice of sanity during chaotic moments, but is frequently embroiled in ridiculous masquerades as she loyally attempts to aid Basil in trying to cover a mistake or keep something from Sybil.

In "The Anniversary" she snaps and refuses to help Basil out when he wants her to impersonate Sybil in the semi-darkness of her bedroom in front of the Fawltys' friends, Basil having dug himself into a hole by claiming Sybil was ill instead of admitting she had stormed out earlier in annoyance with him. Polly finally agrees, but only on condition that Basil lends her money to purchase a car, which he has previously refused to do.

Polly generally is good-natured but sometimes shows her frustration, and has odd moments of malice. In "The Kipper and the Corpse", the pampered shih-tzu dog of an elderly guest bites Polly and Manuel. As revenge, Polly laces the dog's sausages with black pepper and Tabasco sauce ("bangers à la bang"), making it ill and eventually killing it.

Despite her part-time employment (during meal times), Polly frequently is saddled with many other duties, including as manager in "The Germans" when Sybil and Basil are incapacitated. In the first series, Polly is said to be an art student who, according to Basil, has spent three years at college. In "Gourmet Night", she is seen to draw a sketch (presumably of Manuel), which everyone but Basil immediately recognises and she sells to the chef for 50p. Polly is not referred to as a student in the second series, although in both series she is shown to have a flair for languages, displaying ability in both Spanish and German. In "The Germans", Basil alludes to Polly's polyglot inclination by saying that she does her work "while learning two Oriental languages". Like Manuel, she has a room of her own at the hotel.

Manuel

Manuel, a waiter played by Andrew Sachs, is a well-meaning but disorganised and confused Spaniard from Barcelona with a poor grasp of the English language and customs. He is verbally and physically abused by his boss. When told what to do, he often responds, "¿Qué?" ("What?"). Manuel's character is used to demonstrate Basil's instinctive lack of sensitivity and tolerance. Every episode involves Basil becoming enraged at Manuel's confusion at his boss's bizarre demands and even basic requests. Manuel is afraid of Fawlty's quick temper and violent assaults, yet often expresses his appreciation for being given employment. He is relentlessly enthusiastic and is proud of what little English he knows.

During the series, Sachs was seriously injured twice. Cleese describes using a real metal pan to knock Manuel unconscious in "The Wedding Party", although he would have preferred to use a rubber one. The original producer and director, John Howard Davies, said that he made Basil use a metal one and that he was responsible for most of the violence on the show, which he felt was essential to the type of comical farce they were creating. Later, when Sachs's clothes were treated to give off smoke after he escapes the burning kitchen in "The Germans", the corrosive chemicals ate through them and gave Sachs severe burns.

Manuel's exaggerated Spanish accent is part of the humour of the show. In fact, Sachs's original language was German; he emigrated to Britain as a child.

The character's nationality was switched to Italian (and the name to Paolo) for the Spanish dub of the show, while in Catalonia and France, Manuel is a Mexican.

Other regular characters and themes
 Terry Hughes, played by Brian Hall, is the hotel chef throughout the second series. A sly, somewhat shifty Cockney, he is nonetheless a competent chef ("I 'ave been to catering school!"). His cooking methods are occasionally somewhat casual, which frustrates and worries the neurotic Basil. He used to work in Dorchester (not at The Dorchester, as a guest wrongly infers). In "The Anniversary" Terry and Manuel come to blows since Terry doesn't like anyone else cooking in his kitchen, so he proceeds to sabotage the paella Manuel is making for Sybil, leading to fisticuffs at the end of the episode. Cleese himself told Hall to portray Terry as if he were on the run from the police.
 Major Gowen, played by Ballard Berkeley, is a slightly senile, amiable old soldier who is a permanent resident of the hotel. He is one of the few guests whom Basil seems to like. This is because he has the establishment status that Basil craves. He usually wears the Royal Artillery jagged-striped tie, and once mentions to Mrs. Peignoir being in France in 1918. He often is introduced as their "oldest resident" and in the episode "Waldorf Salad" Basil reveals that the Major has lived there for seven years. He enjoys talking about the world outside, especially the cricket scores and workers' strikes (the frequent strikes at British Leyland during the time of the series' original transmission were often mentioned), and is always on the lookout for the newspaper. In the episode "The Germans" he shows he has trouble forgiving the Germans because of the wars. The best he can say is that German women make good card players. In the same episode, he also demonstrates his outdated racial attitudes when he comments about the ethnic difference between "wogs" and "niggers". Despite his good intentions, the Major can cause Basil's plans to go awry, notably in the episode "Communication Problems" in which Basil tries his best to keep secret from Sybil the money he won in a bet.
 Miss Tibbs and Miss Gatsby, played by Gilly Flower and Renee Roberts, are the other two permanent residents. Seemingly inseparable, these sweet-natured, dotty spinsters appear to have taken a fancy to Basil, feeling that they need to take care of him. In response, Basil vacillates between superficial charm and blunt rudeness during his conversations with them.
 Audrey is Sybil's lifelong best friend, and is mostly acknowledged during gossipy telephone calls. Talking with her is a refuge for Sybil. When times get tough for Audrey, who has a dysfunctional relationship with her husband George, Sybil will offer solutions and guidance, often resulting in the catchphrase "Ohhh, I knowwww..." when she tries to commiserate with Audrey's problems. In Audrey's one on-screen appearance, in "The Anniversary", she is played by actress Christine Shaw. Basil tells Major Gowen that he thinks she is a "dreadful woman".
 A running gag throughout the two series is the rearranged letters of the "Fawlty Towers" hotel sign which is shown at the beginning of every episode except "The Germans", when a hospital exterior is used as an establishing shot. In series one, the letters slowly fall from the sign due to lack of maintenance. In series two, the letters are re-arranged into a series of deliberate anagrams. The paperboy, though rarely seen, is revealed at the beginning of "The Psychiatrist" to be the prankster who rearranges the letters on the sign to sometimes crude phrases.
 Terence Conoley appears in two episodes as entirely different characters. In "A Touch of Class" he plays Mr. Wareing, and in "Waldorf Salad" he portrays Mr. Johnston.

Episodes
The first episode of Fawlty Towers was recorded as a pilot on 24 December 1974, the rest of the series being recorded later in 1975. It was then originally broadcast on 19 September. The 12th and final episode was first shown on 25 October 1979. The first series was directed by John Howard Davies, the second by Bob Spiers. Both had their premieres on BBC2.

When originally transmitted, the individual episodes had no on-screen titles. The ones in common currency were first used for the VHS release of the series in the 1980s. There were working titles, such as "USA" for "Waldorf Salad", "Death" for "The Kipper and the Corpse" and "Rat" for "Basil the Rat", which have been printed in some programme guides. In addition, some of the early BBC audio releases of episodes on vinyl and cassette included other variations, such as "Mrs. Richards" and "The Rat" for "Communication Problems" and "Basil the Rat" respectively.

It has long been rumoured that a 13th episode of the series was written and filmed, but never progressed further than a rough cut. Lars Holger Holm, author of the book Fawlty Towers: A Worshipper's Companion, has made detailed claims about the episode's content, but he provides no concrete evidence of its existence.

On the subject of whether more episodes would be produced, Cleese said (in an interview for the complete DVD box set, which was republished in the book Fawlty Towers Fully Booked) that he once had the genesis of a feature-length special—possibly sometime during the mid-1990s. The plot, never fleshed out beyond his initial idea, would have revolved around the chaos that a now-retired Basil typically caused as he and Sybil flew to Barcelona to visit their former employee Manuel and his family. Of the idea, Cleese said:

We had an idea for a plot which I loved. Basil was finally invited to Spain to meet Manuel's family. He gets to Heathrow and then spends about 14 frustrating hours waiting for the flight. Finally, on the plane, a terrorist pulls a gun and tries to hijack the thing. Basil is so angry he overcomes the terrorist, and when the pilot says, "We have to fly back to Heathrow" Basil says, "No, fly us to Spain or I'll shoot you." He arrives in Spain, is immediately arrested, and spends the entire holiday in a Spanish jail. He is released just in time to go back on the plane with Sybil.

It was very funny, but I couldn't do it at the time. Making "Fawlty Towers" work at 90 minutes was a very difficult proposition. You can build up the comedy for 30 minutes, but at that length there has to be a trough and another peak. It doesn't interest me. I don't want to do it.

Cleese also may have been reluctant because of Connie Booth's unwillingness to be involved. She had practically retreated from public life after the show finished (and had been initially unwilling to collaborate on a second series, which explains the four-year gap between productions).

The decision by Cleese and Booth to quit before a third series has often been lauded as it ensured the show's successful status would not be weakened with later, lower-quality work. Subsequently, it has inspired the makers of other shows to do likewise. Ricky Gervais and Stephen Merchant refused to make a third series of either The Office or Extras, citing Fawlty Towers'  short lifespan. Rik Mayall, Ben Elton and Lise Mayer, the writers behind The Young Ones, which also ran for only two series (each with six episodes), used this explanation as well. Victoria Wood also indicated this influenced her decision to limit dinnerladies to 16 episodes over two series.

The origins, background and eventual cancellation of the series were later humorously referenced in 1987's The Secret Policeman's Third Ball in a sketch in which Hugh Laurie and Stephen Fry present Cleese—whom they comically misname "Jim Cleese"—with a Dick Emery Lifetime Achievement Award ("Silver Dick") for his contributions to comedy, then launch into a comical series of questions regarding the show, including Cleese's marriage and divorce from Booth, innocently ridiculing Cleese and reducing him to tears, to a point at which he gets on his knees and crawls off the stage while crying.

Series 1 (1975)

Series 2 (1979)
The second series was transmitted three-and-a-half years later, with the first episode being broadcast on 19 February 1979. Due to an industrial dispute at the BBC, which resulted in a strike, the final episode was not completed until well after the others, being finally shown as a one-off instalment on 25 October 1979. The cancelled episode on 19 March was replaced with a repeat of "Gourmet Night" from series 1. In the second series the anagrams were created by Ian McClane, Bob Spier's assistant floor manager.

Reception

Critical reaction
At first, the series was not held in particularly high esteem. The Daily Mirrors review of the show in 1975 had the headline "Long John Short On Jokes". One critic of the show was Richard Ingrams, then television reviewer for The Spectator, who wrote a caustic piece condemning the programme. Cleese got his revenge by naming one of the guests in the second series "Mr. Ingrams", who is caught in his room with a blow-up doll. Eventually, though, as the series began to gain popularity, critical acclaim followed. Clive James writing in The Observer said the second episode had him "retching with laughter."

On Rotten Tomatoes, Fawlty Towers has an aggregate score of 100% based on 13 critic reviews. The website's consensus reads: "Fawlty Towers looms large over British comedy with John Cleese's impeccably hapless performance and an endless array of exuberant slapstick—making for a supremely stimulating chuckler."

In an interview for the "TV Characters" edition of Channel 4's "talking heads" strand 100 Greatest (in which Basil placed second, between Homer Simpson and Edmund Blackadder), TV critic A. A. Gill theorised that the initially muted response may have been caused by Cleese seemingly ditching his label as a comic revolutionary—earned through his years with Monty Python—to do something more traditional.

In a list of the 100 Greatest British Television Programmes drawn up by the British Film Institute in 2000, voted for by industry professionals, Fawlty Towers was placed first. It was also voted fifth in the "Britain's Best Sitcom" poll in 2004, and second only to Frasier in The Ultimate Sitcom poll of comedy writers in January 2006. Basil Fawlty came top of the Britain's Funniest Comedy Character poll, held by Five on 14 May 2006. In 1997, "The Germans" was ranked No. 12 on TV Guide's 100 Greatest Episodes of All Time. Named in Empire magazine's 2016 list of the greatest TV shows of all time, the entry states,

Awards and accolades

Three British Academy Television Awards (BAFTAs) were awarded to people for their involvement with the series. Both of the series were awarded the BAFTA in the category Best Scripted Comedy, the first being won by John Howard Davies in 1976, and the second by Douglas Argent and Bob Spiers in 1980. In 1980, Cleese received the BAFTA for Best Entertainment Performance.

In a list drawn up by the British Film Institute in 2000, voted by industry professionals, Fawlty Towers was named the best British television series of all time.

Legacy

John Lennon was a fan of the show. He said in 1980: "I love Fawlty Towers. I'd like to be in that. [It's] the greatest show I've seen in years... what a masterpiece, a beautiful thing." Kate Bush stated, "I still think Fawlty Towers is the best sitcom ever." Filmmaker Martin Scorsese has remarked he is a great fan of Fawlty Towers and named "The Germans" as his favourite episode. He described the scene with Basil impersonating Hitler as "so tasteless, it's hilarious".

Remakes, adaptations and reunions
Three attempted remakes of Fawlty Towers were started for the American market, with two making it into production. The first, Chateau Snavely starring Harvey Korman and Betty White, was produced by ABC for a pilot in 1978, but the transfer from coastal hotel to highway motel proved too much and the series never was produced. The second, also by ABC, was Amanda's, starring Bea Arthur, notable for switching the sexes of its Basil and Sybil equivalents. It also failed to pick up a major audience and was dropped after ten episodes had been aired, although 13 episodes were shot. A third remake, called Payne (produced by and starring John Larroquette), was produced in 1999, but was cancelled shortly after. Nine episodes were produced of which eight aired on American television (though the complete run was broadcast overseas). A German pilot based on the sitcom was made in 2001, named Zum letzten Kliff (To the last cliff), but further episodes were not made after its first series.

The popular sitcoms 3rd Rock from the Sun and Cheers (in both of which Cleese made guest appearances) have cited Fawlty Towers as an inspiration, especially regarding its depiction of a dysfunctional workplace "family". Arthur Mathews and Graham Linehan have cited Fawlty Towers as a major influence on their sitcom Father Ted. Guest House on Pakistan's PTV also resembled the series.

Several of the characters have made other appearances, as spinoffs or in small cameo roles. In 1981, in character as Manuel, Andrew Sachs recorded his own version of the Joe Dolce cod-Italian song "Shaddap You Face" (with the B-side "Waiter, There's a Spanish Flea in My Soup") but the record was not released because Joe Dolce took out an injunction: he was about to issue his version in Britain. Sachs also portrayed a Manuel-like character in a series of British TV advertisements for life insurance. Gilly Flower and Renee Roberts, who played the elderly ladies Miss Tibbs and Miss Gatsby in the series, reprised their roles in a 1983 episode of Only Fools and Horses. In 2006, Cleese played Basil Fawlty for the first time in 27 years, for an unofficial England 2006 World Cup song, "Don't Mention the World Cup", taking its name from the phrase, "Don't mention the war," which Basil used in the episode "The Germans". In 2007, Cleese and Sachs reprised their roles for a six-episode corporate business video for the Norwegian oil company Statoil. In the video, Fawlty is running a restaurant called "Basil's Brasserie" while Manuel owns a Michelin-starred restaurant in London.

In November 2007, Prunella Scales returned to the role of Sybil Fawlty in a series of sketches for the BBC's annual Children in Need charity telethon. The character was seen taking over the management of the eponymous hotel from the BBC drama series Hotel Babylon, interacting with characters from that programme as well as other 1970s sitcom characters. The character of Sybil was used by permission of John Cleese. In 2007, the Los Angeles Film School produced seven episodes of Fawlty Tower Oxnard starring Robert Romanus as Basil Fawlty.

At a 2009 reunion event filmed for the Gold channel as Fawlty Towers: Re-Opened, Cleese said that the cast would never make another episode of the series because they are "too old and tired" and expectations would be too high.

In 2016, Cleese reprised his role as Basil in a series of TV adverts for High Street optician chain Specsavers. The same year, Cleese and Booth reunited to create and co-write the official theatrical adaptation of Fawlty Towers, which premiered in Melbourne at the Comedy Theatre. It was critically well received, subsequently embarking on a successful tour of Australia. Cleese was intimately involved in the creation of the stage version from the beginning, including in the casting. He visited Australia to promote the adaptation, as well as oversee its success. Melbourne was chosen to premiere the adaptation due to Fawlty Towers'  enduring popularity in Australia, and also because it has become a popular international test market for large-scale theatrical productions in recent years, having recently been the city where the revised Love Never Dies and the new King Kong were also premiered. Cleese also noted he did not believe the London press would give the adaptation fair, unbiased reviews, so he deliberately chose to premiere it elsewhere.

A sequel series was announced in February 2023, featuring Cleese and his real-life daughter Camilla. The show is under development at Castle Rock Entertainment, with Matthew George, Rob Reiner, Michele Reiner and Derrick Rossi as executive producers. The premise sees Cleese as Basil trying to operate Fawlty Towers with help from his long-lost daughter (to be played by Camilla) and adjusting to the modern world.

Overseas
In 1977 and 1978 alone, the original TV show was sold to 45 stations in 17 countries and was the BBC's best-selling overseas programme for that year. Fawlty Towers became a huge success in almost all countries in which it aired. Although it initially was a flop in Spain, largely because of the portrayal of the Spanish waiter Manuel, it was successfully resold with the Manuel character's nationality changed to Italian except in Spain's Catalan region where Manuel was Mexican. To show how badly it translated, Clive James picked up a clip containing Manuel's "¿Qué?" phrase to show on Clive James on Television in 1982. The series also briefly was broadcast in Italy in the 1990s on the satellite channel Canal Jimmy, in the original English with Italian subtitles.

In Australia, the show originally was broadcast on ABC Television, the first series in 1976 and the second series in 1980. The show then was sold to the Seven Network where it has been repeated numerous times.

Home media and merchandise

Audio releases
Four albums were released by BBC Records on vinyl LP and cassette. These consisted of the original television soundtracks, and from the second album onwards had additional voice-over from Andrew Sachs (in character as Manuel) describing scenes which relied on visual humour.

The first album, simply titled Fawlty Towers, was released in 1979 and contained the audio from "Communication Problems" (as "Mrs Richards") and "Hotel Inspectors". The second album, titled Second Sitting, was released in 1981 and contained audio from "Basil the Rat" (as "The Rat") and "The Builders". Both of these first two albums reached the Top 30 of the UK Albums Chart.

At Your Service was released in 1982, and contained the audio from "The Kipper and the Corpse" (as "Death") and "The Germans" (as "Fire Drill"). Finally, A La Carte was released in 1983, and contained the audio from "Waldorf Salad" (as "The Americans") and "Gourmet Night".

The albums were re-released as double-cassette packs under the titles Fawlty Towers 1 and Fawlty Towers 2 in 1988. The remaining four episodes did not get an audio-only release until they were released on audio cassette as Fawlty Towers 3 in 1994.

The first CD release of the audio versions was in a box set in 2003, titled Fawlty Towers—The Collector's Edition, which included spoken introductions to each episode by John Cleese, and an interview with Prunella Scales and Andrew Sachs.

The four vinyl records were re-released in a limited edition box set, along with the remaining four episodes on vinyl for the first time, for Record Store Day in 2021.

Home media
Fawlty Towers was originally released by BBC Video in 1984, with three episodes on each of four tapes. Each tape was edited with the credits from all three episodes put at the end of the tape. A LaserDisc containing all episodes spliced together as a continuous episode was released in the U.S. on 23 June 1993. It was re-released in 1994, unedited but digitally remastered. It also was re-released in 1998 with a special interview with John Cleese. Fawlty Towers—The Complete Series was released on DVD on 16 October 2001, available in regions 1, 2 and 4. A "Collector's Edition" is available in region 2.

The original DVD release contained a slightly edited version of "The Kipper and the Corpse", in which Basil's line "Is it your legs?" (said to Mr Lehman when asking why he wants breakfast in bed) is missing. This line was restored in subsequent remastered releases of the DVDs.

Series one of the show was released on UMD Video for PSP. In July 2009, BBC America announced a DVD re-release of the Fawlty Towers series. The DVD set was released on 20 October 2009. The reissue, titled Fawlty Towers Remastered: Special Edition, contains commentary by John Cleese on every episode as well as remastered video and audio. All episodes are available as streamed video-on-demand via Britbox, Netflix and Amazon Prime Video. Additionally, both series are available for download on iTunes. In 2021 all episodes were made available on the BBC iPlayer.

Computer game
A Fawlty Towers game was released on PC in 2000 and featured a number of interactive games, desktop-customizing content and clips from the show.

Books
The original scripts of the series were released in a hardback book by Methuen, titled The Complete Fawlty Towers, in 1988.

Notes

References

Further reading
 Apter, Michael J. (1982), first published online in 2004. "Fawlty Towers: A Reversal Theory Analysis of A Popular Television Comedy Series". The Journal of Popular Culture (Blackwell Publishing) 16''' (3): 128–138.
 Bright, Morris; Robert Ross (2001). Fawlty Towers: Fully Booked. London: BBC Books. .
 Cleese, John; Connie Booth (1988). The Complete Fawlty Towers. London: Methuen. .
 Dalla Costa, Dario (2004). The Complexities of Farce: With a Case Study on Fawlty Towers . Unpublished Master's thesis, University of Western Australia, Perth, Australia. Retrieved from http://research-repository.uwa.edu.au/files/3238761/Costa_Dario_Dalla_2004.pdf
 Holm, Lars Holger (2004). Fawlty Towers: A Worshipper's Companion''. London: Leo Publishing. .

External links

 
 
 
 Fawlty Towers at the British Film Institute
 
 Fawlty Towers at the MBC's Encyclopedia of Television
 
 
 Fawlty Towers Guest Characters 

 
1975 British television series debuts
1979 British television series endings
1970s British sitcoms
1970s British workplace comedy television series
BAFTA winners (television series)
BBC television sitcoms
English-language television shows
Fictional hotels
Television series by BBC Studios
Television series about marriage
Television series set in hotels
Television shows set in Devon
Works by John Cleese